The 1938 VFL season was the 42nd season of the Victorian Football League (VFL), the highest level senior Australian rules football competition in Victoria. The season featured twelve clubs, ran from 23 April until 24 September, and comprised an 18-game home-and-away season followed by a finals series featuring the top four clubs.

The premiership was won by the Carlton Football Club for the sixth time, after it defeated  by 15 points in the 1938 VFL Grand Final.

Premiership season
In 1938, the VFL competition consisted of twelve teams of 18 on-the-field players each, plus one substitute player, known as the 19th man. A player could be substituted for any reason; however, once substituted, a player could not return to the field of play under any circumstances.

Teams played each other in a home-and-away season of 18 rounds; matches 12 to 18 were the "home-and-way reverse" of matches 1 to 7.

Once the 18 round home-and-away season had finished, the 1938 VFL Premiers were determined by the specific format and conventions of the Page–McIntyre system.

Round 1

|- bgcolor="#CCCCFF"
| Home team
| Home team score
| Away team
| Away team score
| Venue
| Crowd
| Date
|- bgcolor="#FFFFFF"
| 
| 17.13 (115)
| 
| 20.12 (132)
| Corio Oval
| 16,000
| 23 April 1938
|- bgcolor="#FFFFFF"
| 
| 17.17 (119)
| 
| 12.13 (85)
| Windy Hill
| 15,000
| 23 April 1938
|- bgcolor="#FFFFFF"
| 
| 19.26 (140)
| 
| 9.9 (63)
| Punt Road Oval
| 16,000
| 23 April 1938
|- bgcolor="#FFFFFF"
| 
| 14.13 (97)
| 
| 9.14 (68)
| Lake Oval
| 18,000
| 23 April 1938
|- bgcolor="#FFFFFF"
| 
| 12.15 (87)
| 
| 14.21 (105)
| Brunswick Street Oval
| 22,000
| 23 April 1938
|- bgcolor="#FFFFFF"
| 
| 11.10 (76)
| 
| 14.8 (92)
| Glenferrie Oval
| 18,000
| 23 April 1938

Round 2

|- bgcolor="#CCCCFF"
| Home team
| Home team score
| Away team
| Away team score
| Venue
| Crowd
| Date
|- bgcolor="#FFFFFF"
| 
| 9.10 (64)
| 
| 6.8 (44)
| Arden Street Oval
| 11,000
| 30 April 1938
|- bgcolor="#FFFFFF"
| 
| 18.19 (127)
| 
| 9.20 (74)
| Victoria Park
| 15,000
| 30 April 1938
|- bgcolor="#FFFFFF"
| 
| 12.23 (95)
| 
| 14.10 (94)
| Princes Park
| 32,000
| 30 April 1938
|- bgcolor="#FFFFFF"
| 
| 14.8 (92)
| 
| 16.15 (111)
| MCG
| 11,327
| 30 April 1938
|- bgcolor="#FFFFFF"
| 
| 13.16 (94)
| 
| 8.17 (65)
| Junction Oval
| 17,000
| 30 April 1938
|- bgcolor="#FFFFFF"
| 
| 13.17 (95)
| 
| 10.5 (65)
| Western Oval
| 15,000
| 30 April 1938

Round 3

|- bgcolor="#CCCCFF"
| Home team
| Home team score
| Away team
| Away team score
| Venue
| Crowd
| Date
|- bgcolor="#FFFFFF"
| 
| 20.16 (136)
| 
| 6.11 (47)
| Corio Oval
| 9,500
| 7 May 1938
|- bgcolor="#FFFFFF"
| 
| 12.11 (83)
| 
| 17.14 (116)
| Brunswick Street Oval
| 14,000
| 7 May 1938
|- bgcolor="#FFFFFF"
| 
| 8.12 (60)
| 
| 11.17 (83)
| Lake Oval
| 18,000
| 7 May 1938
|- bgcolor="#FFFFFF"
| 
| 8.14 (62)
| 
| 9.16 (70)
| Glenferrie Oval
| 14,500
| 7 May 1938
|- bgcolor="#FFFFFF"
| 
| 15.12 (102)
| 
| 11.26 (92)
| Punt Road Oval
| 30,000
| 7 May 1938
|- bgcolor="#FFFFFF"
| 
| 14.17 (101)
| 
| 15.12 (102)
| Windy Hill
| 17,000
| 7 May 1938

Round 4

|- bgcolor="#CCCCFF"
| Home team
| Home team score
| Away team
| Away team score
| Venue
| Crowd
| Date
|- bgcolor="#FFFFFF"
| 
| 23.15 (153)
| 
| 15.11 (101)
| MCG
| 14,569
| 14 May 1938
|- bgcolor="#FFFFFF"
| 
| 8.17 (65)
| 
| 10.12 (72)
| Western Oval
| 16,000
| 14 May 1938
|- bgcolor="#FFFFFF"
| 
| 21.15 (141)
| 
| 14.16 (100)
| Victoria Park
| 14,000
| 14 May 1938
|- bgcolor="#FFFFFF"
| 
| 17.19 (121)
| 
| 10.10 (70)
| Princes Park
| 16,000
| 14 May 1938
|- bgcolor="#FFFFFF"
| 
| 15.9 (99)
| 
| 13.11 (89)
| Junction Oval
| 25,000
| 14 May 1938
|- bgcolor="#FFFFFF"
| 
| 14.17 (101)
| 
| 19.11 (125)
| Arden Street Oval
| 15,000
| 14 May 1938

Round 5

|- bgcolor="#CCCCFF"
| Home team
| Home team score
| Away team
| Away team score
| Venue
| Crowd
| Date
|- bgcolor="#FFFFFF"
| 
| 13.9 (87)
| 
| 12.12 (84)
| Glenferrie Oval
| 18,000
| 21 May 1938
|- bgcolor="#FFFFFF"
| 
| 15.15 (105)
| 
| 11.19 (85)
| Windy Hill
| 14,000
| 21 May 1938
|- bgcolor="#FFFFFF"
| 
| 11.16 (82)
| 
| 10.12 (72)
| Junction Oval
| 14,000
| 21 May 1938
|- bgcolor="#FFFFFF"
| 
| 10.12 (72)
| 
| 10.16 (76)
| MCG
| 14,979
| 21 May 1938
|- bgcolor="#FFFFFF"
| 
| 21.21 (147)
| 
| 11.9 (75)
| Corio Oval
| 10,000
| 21 May 1938
|- bgcolor="#FFFFFF"
| 
| 17.12 (114)
| 
| 19.16 (130)
| Victoria Park
| 38,000
| 21 May 1938

Round 6

|- bgcolor="#CCCCFF"
| Home team
| Home team score
| Away team
| Away team score
| Venue
| Crowd
| Date
|- bgcolor="#FFFFFF"
| 
| 17.19 (121)
| 
| 7.13 (55)
| Western Oval
| 21,000
| 28 May 1938
|- bgcolor="#FFFFFF"
| 
| 14.18 (102)
| 
| 16.11 (107)
| Princes Park
| 20,000
| 28 May 1938
|- bgcolor="#FFFFFF"
| 
| 13.16 (94)
| 
| 18.12 (120)
| Lake Oval
| 11,000
| 28 May 1938
|- bgcolor="#FFFFFF"
| 
| 18.9 (117)
| 
| 12.16 (88)
| Punt Road Oval
| 22,000
| 28 May 1938
|- bgcolor="#FFFFFF"
| 
| 14.9 (93)
| 
| 11.13 (79)
| Brunswick Street Oval
| 13,000
| 28 May 1938
|- bgcolor="#FFFFFF"
| 
| 10.7 (67)
| 
| 23.11 (149)
| Arden Street Oval
| 12,000
| 28 May 1938

Round 7

|- bgcolor="#CCCCFF"
| Home team
| Home team score
| Away team
| Away team score
| Venue
| Crowd
| Date
|- bgcolor="#FFFFFF"
| 
| 19.32 (146)
| 
| 10.10 (70)
| Corio Oval
| 8,000
| 4 June 1938
|- bgcolor="#FFFFFF"
| 
| 12.15 (87)
| 
| 14.10 (94)
| Brunswick Street Oval
| 16,000
| 4 June 1938
|- bgcolor="#FFFFFF"
| 
| 16.20 (116)
| 
| 16.7 (103)
| Windy Hill
| 12,000
| 4 June 1938
|- bgcolor="#FFFFFF"
| 
| 9.14 (68)
| 
| 9.16 (70)
| Arden Street Oval
| 15,000
| 4 June 1938
|- bgcolor="#FFFFFF"
| 
| 17.13 (115)
| 
| 15.11 (101)
| MCG
| 30,877
| 4 June 1938
|- bgcolor="#FFFFFF"
| 
| 6.15 (51)
| 
| 12.18 (90)
| Junction Oval
| 24,000
| 4 June 1938

Round 8

|- bgcolor="#CCCCFF"
| Home team
| Home team score
| Away team
| Away team score
| Venue
| Crowd
| Date
|- bgcolor="#FFFFFF"
| 
| 18.14 (122)
| 
| 14.8 (92)
| MCG
| 12,808
| 11 June 1938
|- bgcolor="#FFFFFF"
| 
| 12.12 (84)
| 
| 14.23 (107)
| Windy Hill
| 19,000
| 11 June 1938
|- bgcolor="#FFFFFF"
| 
| 16.23 (119)
| 
| 14.9 (93)
| Victoria Park
| 17,500
| 11 June 1938
|- bgcolor="#FFFFFF"
| 
| 15.20 (110)
| 
| 12.11 (83)
| Princes Park
| 43,000
| 13 June 1938
|- bgcolor="#FFFFFF"
| 
| 8.14 (62)
| 
| 20.15 (135)
| Lake Oval
| 19,000
| 13 June 1938
|- bgcolor="#FFFFFF"
| 
| 7.11 (53)
| 
| 12.22 (94)
| Glenferrie Oval
| 16,000
| 13 June 1938

Round 9

|- bgcolor="#CCCCFF"
| Home team
| Home team score
| Away team
| Away team score
| Venue
| Crowd
| Date
|- bgcolor="#FFFFFF"
| 
| 11.23 (89)
| 
| 6.13 (49)
| Corio Oval
| 7,000
| 18 June 1938
|- bgcolor="#FFFFFF"
| 
| 16.12 (108)
| 
| 8.8 (56)
| Brunswick Street Oval
| 12,000
| 18 June 1938
|- bgcolor="#FFFFFF"
| 
| 14.12 (96)
| 
| 16.16 (112)
| Junction Oval
| 14,000
| 18 June 1938
|- bgcolor="#FFFFFF"
| 
| 15.14 (104)
| 
| 15.9 (99)
| Punt Road Oval
| 20,000
| 18 June 1938
|- bgcolor="#FFFFFF"
| 
| 13.9 (87)
| 
| 10.5 (65)
| Western Oval
| 18,000
| 18 June 1938
|- bgcolor="#FFFFFF"
| 
| 11.5 (71)
| 
| 16.25 (121)
| Arden Street Oval
| 13,000
| 18 June 1938

Round 10

|- bgcolor="#CCCCFF"
| Home team
| Home team score
| Away team
| Away team score
| Venue
| Crowd
| Date
|- bgcolor="#FFFFFF"
| 
| 8.12 (60)
| 
| 9.10 (64)
| Glenferrie Oval
| 10,000
| 25 June 1938
|- bgcolor="#FFFFFF"
| 
| 12.16 (88)
| 
| 6.10 (46)
| Brunswick Street Oval
| 12,000
| 25 June 1938
|- bgcolor="#FFFFFF"
| 
| 14.16 (100)
| 
| 17.9 (111)
| Windy Hill
| 18,000
| 25 June 1938
|- bgcolor="#FFFFFF"
| 
| 12.17 (89)
| 
| 10.8 (68)
| Punt Road Oval
| 23,000
| 25 June 1938
|- bgcolor="#FFFFFF"
| 
| 13.12 (90)
| 
| 13.17 (95)
| Corio Oval
| 13,000
| 25 June 1938
|- bgcolor="#FFFFFF"
| 
| 11.7 (73)
| 
| 16.13 (109)
| Lake Oval
| 14,000
| 25 June 1938

Round 11

|- bgcolor="#CCCCFF"
| Home team
| Home team score
| Away team
| Away team score
| Venue
| Crowd
| Date
|- bgcolor="#FFFFFF"
| 
| 13.20 (98)
| 
| 7.4 (46)
| Western Oval
| 20,000
| 2 July 1938
|- bgcolor="#FFFFFF"
| 
| 12.17 (89)
| 
| 12.5 (77)
| Victoria Park
| 10,000
| 2 July 1938
|- bgcolor="#FFFFFF"
| 
| 12.16 (88)
| 
| 12.10 (82)
| Princes Park
| 19,500
| 2 July 1938
|- bgcolor="#FFFFFF"
| 
| 13.14 (92)
| 
| 12.6 (78)
| Arden Street Oval
| 4,000
| 2 July 1938
|- bgcolor="#FFFFFF"
| 
| 11.8 (74)
| 
| 10.11 (71)
| Junction Oval
| 10,000
| 2 July 1938
|- bgcolor="#FFFFFF"
| 
| 11.13 (79)
| 
| 13.7 (85)
| MCG
| 12,054
| 2 July 1938

Round 12

|- bgcolor="#CCCCFF"
| Home team
| Home team score
| Away team
| Away team score
| Venue
| Crowd
| Date
|- bgcolor="#FFFFFF"
| 
| 15.13 (103)
| 
| 22.17 (149)
| Junction Oval
| 17,000
| 13 June 1938
|- bgcolor="#FFFFFF"
| 
| 14.3 (87)
| 
| 12.11 (83)
| Arden Street Oval
| 11,000
| 9 July 1938
|- bgcolor="#FFFFFF"
| 
| 19.19 (133)
| 
| 10.10 (70)
| Western Oval
| 16,000
| 9 July 1938
|- bgcolor="#FFFFFF"
| 
| 10.19 (79)
| 
| 10.13 (73)
| Victoria Park
| 15,000
| 9 July 1938
|- bgcolor="#FFFFFF"
| 
| 12.12 (84)
| 
| 8.15 (63)
| Princes Park
| 14,000
| 9 July 1938
|- bgcolor="#FFFFFF"
| 
| 11.8 (74)
| 
| 13.14 (92)
| MCG
| 20,185
| 9 July 1938

Round 13

|- bgcolor="#CCCCFF"
| Home team
| Home team score
| Away team
| Away team score
| Venue
| Crowd
| Date
|- bgcolor="#FFFFFF"
| 
| 10.9 (69)
| 
| 9.16 (70)
| Glenferrie Oval
| 7,000
| 23 July 1938
|- bgcolor="#FFFFFF"
| 
| 14.20 (104)
| 
| 15.13 (103)
| Corio Oval
| 7,000
| 23 July 1938
|- bgcolor="#FFFFFF"
| 
| 13.8 (86)
| 
| 18.21 (129)
| Brunswick Street Oval
| 16,000
| 23 July 1938
|- bgcolor="#FFFFFF"
| 
| 14.11 (95)
| 
| 13.18 (96)
| Lake Oval
| 8,000
| 23 July 1938
|- bgcolor="#FFFFFF"
| 
| 17.17 (119)
| 
| 17.16 (118)
| Windy Hill
| 13,000
| 23 July 1938
|- bgcolor="#FFFFFF"
| 
| 20.12 (132)
| 
| 12.19 (91)
| Punt Road Oval
| 28,000
| 23 July 1938

Round 14

|- bgcolor="#CCCCFF"
| Home team
| Home team score
| Away team
| Away team score
| Venue
| Crowd
| Date
|- bgcolor="#FFFFFF"
| 
| 10.12 (72)
| 
| 7.12 (54)
| Junction Oval
| 10,000
| 30 July 1938
|- bgcolor="#FFFFFF"
| 
| 17.14 (116)
| 
| 4.7 (31)
| Western Oval
| 11,000
| 30 July 1938
|- bgcolor="#FFFFFF"
| 
| 9.9 (63)
| 
| 11.10 (76)
| Victoria Park
| 22,000
| 30 July 1938
|- bgcolor="#FFFFFF"
| 
| 11.16 (82)
| 
| 10.16 (76)
| Princes Park
| 18,000
| 30 July 1938
|- bgcolor="#FFFFFF"
| 
| 7.9 (51)
| 
| 15.16 (106)
| Arden Street Oval
| 8,000
| 30 July 1938
|- bgcolor="#FFFFFF"
| 
| 14.12 (96)
| 
| 14.9 (93)
| MCG
| 9,060
| 30 July 1938

Round 15

|- bgcolor="#CCCCFF"
| Home team
| Home team score
| Away team
| Away team score
| Venue
| Crowd
| Date
|- bgcolor="#FFFFFF"
| 
| 7.11 (53)
| 
| 7.14 (56)
| Punt Road Oval
| 15,000
| 6 August 1938
|- bgcolor="#FFFFFF"
| 
| 13.9 (87)
| 
| 16.8 (104)
| Windy Hill
| 10,000
| 6 August 1938
|- bgcolor="#FFFFFF"
| 
| 9.16 (70)
| 
| 14.15 (99)
| Lake Oval
| 8,000
| 6 August 1938
|- bgcolor="#FFFFFF"
| 
| 13.15 (93)
| 
| 10.10 (70)
| Corio Oval
| 18,500
| 6 August 1938
|- bgcolor="#FFFFFF"
| 
| 12.11 (83)
| 
| 18.15 (123)
| Glenferrie Oval
| 8,000
| 6 August 1938
|- bgcolor="#FFFFFF"
| 
| 11.10 (76)
| 
| 19.12 (126)
| Brunswick Street Oval
| 17,000
| 6 August 1938

Round 16

|- bgcolor="#CCCCFF"
| Home team
| Home team score
| Away team
| Away team score
| Venue
| Crowd
| Date
|- bgcolor="#FFFFFF"
| 
| 12.11 (83)
| 
| 7.15 (57)
| Arden Street Oval
| 9,000
| 13 August 1938
|- bgcolor="#FFFFFF"
| 
| 19.17 (131)
| 
| 13.13 (91)
| Western Oval
| 19,000
| 13 August 1938
|- bgcolor="#FFFFFF"
| 
| 13.12 (90)
| 
| 19.12 (126)
| Brunswick Street Oval
| 8,000
| 13 August 1938
|- bgcolor="#FFFFFF"
| 
| 14.17 (101)
| 
| 19.7 (121)
| Princes Park
| 37,000
| 13 August 1938
|- bgcolor="#FFFFFF"
| 
| 19.18 (132)
| 
| 12.11 (83)
| Punt Road Oval
| 9,000
| 13 August 1938
|- bgcolor="#FFFFFF"
| 
| 13.13 (91)
| 
| 12.14 (86)
| Lake Oval
| 8,000
| 13 August 1938

Round 17

|- bgcolor="#CCCCFF"
| Home team
| Home team score
| Away team
| Away team score
| Venue
| Crowd
| Date
|- bgcolor="#FFFFFF"
| 
| 17.15 (117)
| 
| 9.20 (74)
| Glenferrie Oval
| 7,000
| 20 August 1938
|- bgcolor="#FFFFFF"
| 
| 20.17 (137)
| 
| 12.12 (84)
| Corio Oval
| 19,500
| 20 August 1938
|- bgcolor="#FFFFFF"
| 
| 15.17 (107)
| 
| 15.6 (96)
| Windy Hill
| 9,000
| 20 August 1938
|- bgcolor="#FFFFFF"
| 
| 22.18 (150)
| 
| 14.12 (96)
| Victoria Park
| 14,000
| 20 August 1938
|- bgcolor="#FFFFFF"
| 
| 17.17 (119)
| 
| 12.9 (81)
| Junction Oval
| 17,000
| 20 August 1938
|- bgcolor="#FFFFFF"
| 
| 14.12 (96)
| 
| 11.13 (79)
| MCG
| 25,241
| 20 August 1938

Round 18

|- bgcolor="#CCCCFF"
| Home team
| Home team score
| Away team
| Away team score
| Venue
| Crowd
| Date
|- bgcolor="#FFFFFF"
| 
| 18.11 (119)
| 
| 11.18 (84)
| Western Oval
| 13,000
| 27 August 1938
|- bgcolor="#FFFFFF"
| 
| 12.19 (91)
| 
| 11.16 (82)
| Victoria Park
| 30,000
| 27 August 1938
|- bgcolor="#FFFFFF"
| 
| 15.14 (104)
| 
| 13.10 (88)
| Princes Park
| 16,000
| 27 August 1938
|- bgcolor="#FFFFFF"
| 
| 12.8 (80)
| 
| 15.12 (102)
| Lake Oval
| 6,000
| 27 August 1938
|- bgcolor="#FFFFFF"
| 
| 13.15 (93)
| 
| 15.18 (108)
| Punt Road Oval
| 7,000
| 27 August 1938
|- bgcolor="#FFFFFF"
| 
| 9.15 (69)
| 
| 12.18 (90)
| Glenferrie Oval
| 6,500
| 27 August 1938

Ladder

Finals

Semi finals

|- bgcolor="#CCCCFF"
| Home team
| Score
| Away team
| Score
| Venue
| Crowd
| Date
|- bgcolor="#FFFFFF"
| 
| 10.16 (76)
| Collingwood
| 18.9 (117)
| MCG
| 68,556
| 3 September
|- bgcolor="#FFFFFF"
| 
| 16.17 (113)
| 
| 10.21 (81)
| MCG
| 65,332
| 10 September

Preliminary Final

|- bgcolor="#CCCCFF"
| Home team
| Score
| Away team
| Score
| Venue
| Crowd
| Date
|- bgcolor="#FFFFFF"
| 
| 14.14 (98)
| 
| 21.9 (135)
| MCG
| 60,956
| 17 September

Grand final

Carlton defeated Collingwood 15.10 (100) to 13.7 (85), in front of a crowd of 96,834 people. (For an explanation of scoring see Australian rules football).

Awards
 The 1938 VFL Premiership team was Carlton.
 The VFL's leading goalkicker was Ron Todd of Collingwood with 102 goals (120 after finals).
 The Argus newspaper's "Player of the Year", was shared between Norman Ware of Footscray and Marcus Boyall of Collingwood.
 The winner of the 1938 Brownlow Medal was Dick Reynolds of Essendon with 18 votes.
 South Melbourne took the "wooden spoon" in 1938.
Geelong 12.19 (91) defeated  12.8 (80) in the Grand Final, played as a stand-alone game on Thursday 29 September (Show Day holiday) at the Melbourne Cricket Ground, before a crowd of 5,500.

Notable events
 Geelong half-back flanker Jack Grant won the 1938 130-yard Stawell Gift in eleven and eleven-sixteenths seconds, off a handicap of 11½ yards.
 The VFL investigated an allegation from the Carlton Football Club that Collingwood rover Harry Collier had king-hit Carlton wingman Jack Carney (one of the smallest ever VFL players at 160 cm) as the teams left the field after the final bell of the Round 5 match at Victoria Park. Collier was suspended for the rest of the 1938 season.
 Jack Titus revealed that he had been offered £50 by a betting syndicate to play "dead" in Richmond's Round 8 match against South Melbourne. Richmond thrashed South Melbourne 20.15 (135) to 8.14 (62).
 Footscray becomes the first of the three teams who joined the league in 1925 to make the finals.  North Melbourne would not make its first final appearance until 1945 and Hawthorn's first appearance came in 1957.
 With their win over Collingwood in Round 5, Carlton held an overall winning record against every other club in the competition. However, this would only last until Round 16 when the clubs next met, with Collingwood evening the record. With their Grand Final victory over the Magpies, Carlton once again had a winning record over every other club in combined regular season and finals matches. This would last until Round 8 of the following season, with Collingwood defeating Carlton to even their record.
Four of the six games in Round 13 were decided by a one-point margin.

References

 Rogers, S. & Brown, A., Every Game Ever Played: VFL/AFL Results 1897–1997 (Sixth Edition), Viking Books, (Ringwood), 1998. 
 Ross, J. (ed), 100 Years of Australian Football 1897–1996: The Complete Story of the AFL, All the Big Stories, All the Great Pictures, All the Champions, Every AFL Season Reported, Viking, (Ringwood), 1996.

External links
 1938 Season - AFL Tables

Australian Football League seasons
Vfl season